The 60th British Academy Television Awards nominations were announced on 7 April 2014. The awards ceremony sponsored by Arqiva was held on 18 May 2014 at the Theatre Royal, Drury Lane, London.

Winners and nominations 

Winners are listed first and emboldened.

Programmes with multiple nominations 
Channel 4 lead the most nominations for any network with 28, 9 ahead of BBC One who had 19. Channel 4's The IT Crowd and Southcliffe as well as ITV's Broadchurch lead the nominations for programming with four nods each.

Most major wins

In Memoriam 

 Bob Hoskins
 Eddie Braben
 John Fortune
 David Frost
 Felix Dexter
 Edna Doré
 Kate O'Mara
 Mike Winters
 Addison Cresswell
 Roger Lloyd-Pack
 Richard Thorp
 James Ellis
 Alan Whicker
 Bill Pertwee
 David Jacobs
 Clarissa Dickson Wright
 Paul Shane
 David Coleman
 Lewis Collins
 Bernie Nolan
 John Cole
 Richard Broke
 James Gandolfini
 Jim Goddard
 Cliff Morgan
 Mel Smith

See also 
 British Academy Television Awards
 BAFTA Scotland
 BAFTA Cymru

References

External links 
 Official site at BAFTA.org

2014 awards in the United Kingdom
2014 in British television
British Academy Television Awards, 2014
Annual television shows
Television
British Academy Television Awards
May 2014 events in the United Kingdom